Dorcadion lameeri is a species of beetle in the family Cerambycidae. It was described by Théry in 1896. It is known from Turkey.

References

lameeri
Beetles described in 1896